Shefali Oza (born 24 September 1967) is a British TV personality and the main weather presenter on BBC Birmingham's Midlands Today, the regional news programme broadcast in the Midlands of England, but also carries out some news presentation work. She joined the programme in January 1993 as its first ever weather presenter.

Career
Oza is said to have been "discovered at an audition day" organised by members of the BBC's Multi-Cultural Programmes Unit, who were actually in search of new faces for Network East.

Oza was one of the first Asian faces to be frequently seen on television in the region. She joined Midlands Today in 1993 as the programme's first weather presenter; since then her role has included producing weather-related news and community features. One of her reports was as a result of becoming the first female civilian to spend a week on the Royal Navy submarine HMS Splendid. She was awarded an Honorary Master's degree from University College Worcester in 2003, in recognition of her achievements in broadcasting.

Along with weather reporting and news presenting, Oza has fronted regional contributions to the BBC's live national programming and campaigns such as Children in Need.

Personal life
Before beginning her media career, Oza trained as a solicitor. Her father is a GP based in Nottingham.

During her time on Midlands Today Oza met her husband-to-be Jamie Knights, who worked as her cameraman. Their wedding ceremony was featured on the news programme. The couple divorced two years later.

As of 2016, Oza resided in the Birmingham suburb of Moseley.

References

External links
Shefali Oza's Midlands Today profile
Shefali Oza's website

BBC people
BBC weather forecasters
English journalists
Living people
1967 births
English people of Indian descent
Indian emigrants to England